The Dutch Cemetery of Chinsurah was constructed on the order of the director of the Dutch East India Company in Bengal. The cemetery and all its graves are now maintained and Archaeological Survey of India under the protection of ancient monuments and archaeological sites and remains of national importance.

Notable people buried 
 Charles Cameron, Scottish army officer
 Daniel Anthony Overbeek, the last resident of Dutch Bengal

References

External links

 

Cemeteries in India
Dutch Bengal